Teynur Marem Marem (born 23 September 1994) is a Bulgarian footballer who plays as a defender for Sayana Haskovo.

Career
Marem started his career from Sliven 2000. During season 2010-11 he made his debut for the team in A group. He has 3 matches for the team. He formerly played for Ludogorets Razgrad, but did not establish himself as a starter.

Career statistics

Club

Honours

Club 
Ludogorets
 A PFG 2012–13

References

External links
Тейнур Марем at sportal.bg

1994 births
Living people
Bulgarian footballers
Bulgaria under-21 international footballers
Bulgaria youth international footballers
First Professional Football League (Bulgaria) players
Second Professional Football League (Bulgaria) players
OFC Sliven 2000 players
PFC Ludogorets Razgrad II players
PFC Ludogorets Razgrad players
FC Haskovo players
FC Dunav Ruse players
FC Tsarsko Selo Sofia players
PFC Slavia Sofia players
Association football defenders
Bulgarian people of Turkish descent
People from Haskovo
Sportspeople from Haskovo Province